Runnel(s) may refer to:

Runnel Stone, a hazardous rock pinnacle near Gwennap Head, Cornwall, United Kingdom
Runnels, a surname
Runnels County, Texas, United States
A small stream
A channel along the side of a bicycle stairway